The Hazfi Cup 2008–09 is the 22nd staging of Iran's football knockout competition. Esteghlal is the defending champions.

The cup winner were guaranteed a place in the 2010 AFC Champions League.

First round

Second round

Third round

Fourth Round (1/16 Final - Last 32)

Fifth Round (1/8 Final - Last 16)

Quarterfinals

Semifinals

Final

Leg 1

Leg 2

Bracket

See also
 2008–09 Persian Gulf Cup
 2008–09 Azadegan League
 2008–09 Iran Football's 2nd Division
 2008–09 Iran Football's 3rd Division
 2009 Hazfi Cup Final
 Iranian Super Cup
 2008–09 Iranian Futsal Super League

2008
Hazfi Cup, 2008-09
Hazfi Cup, 2008-09